Aferdita Kameraj (born 5 June 1984 in Deçan, Yugoslavia) is a German football defender of Kosovar descent. She currently plays for Cloppenburg in the 2nd Bundesliga.

Career
Kameraj was born in Yugoslavia (now Kosovo). She moved to Hamburg with her family when she was a little child. Her career began at the HEBC Hamburg. She then moved to FTSV Altenwerder before joining the Hamburger SV in 2000. She won promotion to the Bundesliga in 2001 and 2003 and played the German Cup final in 2002 with the team.

In 2006 Kameraj signed for Turbine Potsdam, with which she also played the UEFA Women's Cup. Two years later she returned to Hamburger SV, for which she played until the team withdrew from the Bundesliga for financial reasons in 2012. She then moved to Cloppenburg in the second tier.

She made several appearances for Germany on the junior level, playing the 2004 U-19 European Championship.

Notes

References

1984 births
Living people
People from Deçan
German women's footballers
Kosovan expatriates in Germany
Expatriate women's footballers in Germany
Hamburger SV (women) players
1. FFC Turbine Potsdam players
Women's association football defenders
HEBC Hamburg players